Thiruvalla copper plates, also known as the Huzur Treasury Plates, are a collection of medieval temple committee resolutions found at the Sreevallabha Temple, Thiruvalla, Kerala. The collection of plates, engraved in old Malayalam language in Vattezhuthu with some Grantha characters, can be dated to 10th and 11th centuries AD.

The collection consist of forty three plates with writing on both sides, but more than half a dozen plates are missing. The contents of the copper plates belong to different periods. The plates were collected, rearranged and edited at a late date. The plates are considered as a treasure trove of information about medieval temple rituals, deities, festivals, castes, professions, personal names, plot names, and prices.

The plates were first published in Travancore Archaeological Series by T. A. Gopinatha Rao, under the title "The Huzur Treasury Plates". They were originally kept in the Sreevallabha Temple, Thiruvalla (now with Archeological Department of Kerala).

Major donors to Thiruvalla Temple

Kings and queens 

 Chola king Parantaka Vira Chola (907―955 AD)
 Kizhan Adikal (queen of Parantaka)
 Chera/Perumal king Bhaskara Ravi Manukuladitya (962―1021 AD).
 Nambirattiyar (queen of Chera/Perumal )

Kerala chieftains 

 Ramakuda Muvar, chieftain of Kolathu-nadu
 Eran Chankaran, chieftain of Purakizha-nadu
 Ravi Chirikandan, chieftain of Vembanadu
 Kumaran Yakkan, chieftain of Vembanadu Thekkin-Kuru
 Kantan Kumaran Maluvakkon, chieftain of Kizhmalai-nadu
 Raman Kotavarman, chieftain of Munji-nadu
 Raman Madevi, wife of the chieftain of Munji-nadu
 Munjimarayar, chieftain of Munji-nadu
Venattadikal, chieftain of Venad

References

External links 

 Accretion of Temple's Centrality: Searching the Tiruvalla Copperplates by A Mathew 

Indian inscriptions
inscriptions
History of Kerala
Chera dynasty
Kerala history inscriptions
Malayalam inscriptions